Robert Henry Levien, always known as Harry Levien (17 October 1845 – 12 July 1938) was a solicitor and politician in New South Wales, Australia.

He was born in Singleton to general merchant Alfred Levien and Mayalla MacDerniod. He was educated at West Maitland and became a solicitor's clerk in Newcastle in 1866. He was admitted as a solicitor in 1873, practising at Tenterfield (1873–75), West Maitland (1875–79) and Tamworth (1879–81) before moving to Sydney. On 22 October 1879 he married Harriette Emma Cousins, with whom he had three children.

In 1880 he was elected to the New South Wales Legislative Assembly as the member for Tamworth. A Protectionist, he served as a backbencher for over thirty years (including the period 1894–1904 as member for Quirindi), until he was defeated in 1913. Having become an independent following the collapse of the Progressive Party in 1907, he continued to contest elections as an independent until 1927. He did not hold any ministerial or other parliamentary office.

References

 

1849 births
1938 deaths
Protectionist Party politicians
Independent members of the Parliament of New South Wales
Members of the New South Wales Legislative Assembly